The 2023 McDonald's All-American Boys Game is an all-star basketball game that will be played on March 28, 2023, at Toyota Center in Houston, Texas. The game's rosters featured the best and most highly recruited high school boys graduating in the class of 2023. The game was the 46th annual version of the McDonald's All-American Game first played in 1977.
The 24 players were selected from over 700 nominees by a committee of basketball experts. They were chosen not only for their on-court skills, but for their performances off the court as well.

Rosters
The roster was announced on January 24, 2023.  Kentucky has the most selections with four, while Duke had three and Michigan State & Oregon both had two each.  At the announcement of the roster selections, 15 schools were represented, one player Matas Buzelis, opted for the G–League and one player, Bronny James was uncommitted.

Team East

Team West

^undecided at the time of roster selection
~undecided at game time
Reference

Box Score

References

McDonald's All-American Boys Game
McDonald's All-American